Proietti is an Italian surname. Notable people with the surname include:
Biagio Proietti (1940–2022), Italian screenwriter, director and writer
Cristiana Proietti, American fashion designer
Gigi Proietti (1940–2020), Italian actor
Francesco Cosimi Proietti (born 1951), Italian politician
Giovanni Proietti (born 1977), Italian footballer
Jonathan Proietti (born 1982), Luxembourgian footballer
Monica Proietti (1940–1967), Canadian bank robber

Italian-language surnames